The lists shown below shows the Iraq national football team all-time record against opposing nations. The statistics are composed of FIFA World Cup, FIFA Confederations Cup, AFC Asian Cup and Summer Olympics matches, as well as numerous international friendly tournaments and matches.

Records

Most capped players
.
Players in bold are still active with Iraq.

Players with an equal number of caps are ranked in chronological order of reaching the milestone.

Top goalscorers
.

Competitive record

FIFA World Cup

AFC Asian Cup

FIFA Confederations Cup

Summer Olympics

Asian Games

Regional competitions

Minor tournaments

Head-to-head record
The following table shows Iraq's all-time international record, correct as of 30 December 2022 (vs. ).

Penalty shootout record

See also
 Iraq at the FIFA World Cup
 Iraq at the AFC Asian Cup

References

External links
 Iraqi Football Website
 History of Iraq National Team
 FIFA.com
 Iraq - List of International Matches, RSSSF, 21 Jan 2006
 World Football Elo Ratings: Iraq

records and statistics
National association football team records and statistics